The 2018 Arema F.C. season is Arema's 29th competitive season. The club will compete in Indonesia League 1, Piala Indonesia and Indonesia President's Cup. Arema Football Club a professional football club based in Malang, East Java, Indonesia. The season covers the period from 1 January 2018 to 31 December 2018.

On 14 May 2018, with just one wins in the first 8 league games, manager Joko Susilo was sacked. His last game, one days earlier, ended in a 1–1 draw to PSM Makassar. The following day, assistant coach Milan Petrović was appointed as manager until the end of the season.

Squad information

First team squad

Transfers

In

Out

Loan In

Loan Out

Pre-seasons and friendlies

Friendlies

Indonesia President's Cup

Group stage

<onlyinclude>

Knockout phase

East Kalimantan Governor Cup

Group stage

Knockout phase

Match results

Liga 1

Matches

League table

Piala Indonesia

Statistics

Squad appearances and goals
Last updated on 22 November 2018.

|-
! colspan=13 style=background:#dcdcdc; text-align:center|Goalkeepers

|-
! colspan=13 style=background:#dcdcdc; text-align:center|Defenders

|-
! colspan=14 style=background:#dcdcdc; text-align:center|Midfielders

|-
! colspan=14 style=background:#dcdcdc; text-align:center|Forwards

|-
! colspan=14 style=background:#dcdcdc; text-align:center|Players transferred or loaned out during the season the club 
 
 

 

|-
|}

Top scorers
The list is sorted by shirt number when total goals are equal.

Notes

References

Arema FC